The Clinton-Glen Gardner School District is a community public school district that serves students in pre-kindergarten through eighth grade from the Town of Clinton and the Borough of Glen Gardner, in Hunterdon County, New Jersey, United States. Before Glen Gardner, a non-operating district, was consolidated into the district, students from the borough had attended the district's school as part of a sending/receiving relationship. Other students attend the school on a tuition basis. Formerly known as the Town of Clinton School District, the district's board of education voted in November 2009 to revise the name to Clinton-Glen Gardner School District to reflect the merger.

As of the 2018–19 school year, the district, comprised of one school, had an enrollment of 431 students and 44.7 classroom teachers (on an FTE basis), for a student–teacher ratio of 9.6:1.

The district is classified by the New Jersey Department of Education as being in District Factor Group "I", the second-highest of eight groupings. District Factor Groups organize districts statewide to allow comparison by common socioeconomic characteristics of the local districts. From lowest socioeconomic status to highest, the categories are A, B, CD, DE, FG, GH, I and J.

Public school students in ninth through twelfth grades attend either North Hunterdon High School in Annandale or Voorhees High School in Glen Gardner as part of the North Hunterdon-Voorhees Regional High School District. North Hunterdon High School serves students from Clinton Town, along with those from Clinton Township, Bethlehem Township, Franklin Township, Union Township, and Lebanon Borough, while students from Glen Gardner attend Voorhees High School, which also serves students from Califon, Hampton, High Bridge, Lebanon Township and Tewksbury Township. As of the 2018–19 school year, North Hunterdon High School had an enrollment of 1,584 students and 123.2 classroom teachers (on an FTE basis), for a student–teacher ratio of 12.9:1. and Voorhees High School had an enrollment of 982 students and 83.1 classroom teachers (on an FTE basis), for a student–teacher ratio of 11.8:1.

Awards and recognition
Clinton Public School was named as a "Star School" by the New Jersey Department of Education, the highest honor that a New Jersey school can achieve, in the 1994-95 school year.

School
Clinton Public School had an enrollment of 443 students in grades PreK-8as of the 2017–18 school year.
Dr. Seth Cohen, Principal
Jacqueline Turner, Assistant Principal / Curriculum Coordinator

The school building was built in 1923 to replace a previous structure destroyed in a large fire, with additions in 1969, 1996, and 2001.

Sports
Boys' and Girls' Soccer
Boys' and Girls' Cross Country - Boys Cross Country team won the 2013 North Hunterdon-Voorhees District Meet after going 9-1, winning the title over their only loss from High Bridge Middle School by 4 points. Clinton Public had 3rd, 4th, 5th, 6th, and 18th place in the boys' race.
Girls' Volleyball-The girls volleyball team won the 2013 and 2014 district volleyball Tournament and in 2015 they placed 2nd.
Boys' and Girls' Basketball
Girls' Cheerleading
Boys' Baseball
Girls' Softball

Administration
Core members of the district's administration include:
Dr. Seth Cohen, Superintendent
Bernadette Wang, Business Administrator / Board Secretary

Board of education
The district's board of education, comprised of five members, sets policy and oversees the fiscal and educational operation of the district through its administration. As a Type II school district, the board's trustees are elected directly by voters to serve three-year terms of office on a staggered basis, with either one or two seats up for election each year held (since 2012) as part of the November general election. The board appoints a superintendent to oversee the day-to-day operation of the district.

References

External links 
Clinton-Glen Gardner School District website
 
School Data for the Clinton-Glen Gardner School District, National Center for Education Statistics
North Hunterdon-Voorhees Regional High School District

Clinton, New Jersey
New Jersey District Factor Group I
School districts in Hunterdon County, New Jersey
Glen Gardner, New Jersey
Public K–8 schools in New Jersey